Alessandro Aleotti (born 5 August 1972), known as J-Ax, is an Italian rapper, formerly in the rap group Articolo 31 with his DJ Vito Luca Perrini (DJ Jad). He is the brother of Weedo (also known as Grido from boyband Gemelli DiVersi). On 6 May 2010, he created the band Due di Picche ('Two of Spades') with Neffa.

Biography 
From 1990 to 2005, J-Ax (abbreviation of Joker Alex) rose to prominence as part of the popular Italian rap group Articolo 31 which he founded with Vito Luca Perrini, AKA "DJ Jad". In 2014 he became a judge on the show The Voice of Italy.

Articolo 31

Soloist
In 2006 J-Ax released his first solo album, . This album, which was very pop oriented, spawned no fewer than six singles: "S.N.O.B.", "", "", "", "" and "". The single "" was also translated and released in Spanish as "". This album continued themes used by Articolo 31, such as knowing love (""), criticising society, ("S.N.O.B.", "") and the protection of immigrants ("", "").

In 2007 he teamed up with The Styles to release the single "", which won at the MTV Europe Music Awards for "Best Italian Act".

In the same year, he released material with some of "Spaghetti Funk", a crew which he created at the same time as Articolo 31 in the 90s with Gemelli DiVersi, Space One, Raptuz TDK (a writer) and a lot of other singers that now aren't in the crew.

Later, on the album  he released the song "S.N.O.B. reloaded" with Space One, Gué Pequeno, Jake La Furia, Marracash, Don Joe and Fabio B.
In 2007, he also participated in MTV Day with DJ Jad and reformed their old group for a day.

J-Ax did not release an album in 2007, although he had many projects on, which continued into 2008. He sang on "" by Space One with Gemelli Diversi, "" by Pino Scotto and Fattore wow with Marracash and Gue Pequeno.
He also wrote three songs in that year: "", a thank you to his fans; "", for the soundtrack of the film ; and "", the first single of his next album.

In 2011, J-Ax appeared on the remix of Kasabian's single "Man of Simple Pleasures".

2009

At the beginning of 2009 J-Ax launched a project: to release two CDs in the year. The first, Rap N' Roll was released at the end of January. As well as "", he released 3 singles: "", "" and "Rap N' Roll". Artists who worked with him on the album include Space One, DJ Zak, Gué Pequeno, Irene Viboras, Fabio B and Guido Style, with whom he had worked since "".

In the summer of 2009 he released his third CD as a solo artist, Deca dance. J-Ax paid homage to house music with this album with the single "Deca Dance" as well as more traditional singles with "" and "". He also shows his sense of humour on "I love paranoia" and "". Pino Daniele, Marracash, Grido and Jovanotti took part in the album as well as another partnership with The Styles.

Discography

With Articolo 31 
 1993 – 
 1993 – 
 1994 – 
 1996 – 
 1998 – 
 1999 – 
 2000 – Greatest hits
 2002 – 
 2003 – 
 2004 –

Solo 
 2006 – 
 2009 – Rap n' Roll
 2009 – Deca Dance
 2011 – 
 2015 – 
 2020 – ReAle

Collaborations 
 2010 –  with Neffa (Due di Picche)
 2017 – Comunisti col Rolex with Fedez

Singles

Since 2006 – solo 
2006: ""
2006: ""
2006: ""
2006: ""
2006: ""
2007: ""
2007: ""
2007: ""
2007: ""
2007: "S.N.O.B. reloaded"
2007: "+ Stile" (featuring The Styles)
2008: "" (from the album  by Pino Scotto)
2008: "" (featuring Spaghetti Funk)
2009: "Rap n' Roll" (featuring Guè Pequeno)
2009: ""
2009: "" (featuring The Styles)
2009: ""
2009: "" (featuring Irene Viboras)
2009: "" (featuring Pino Daniele)
2009: ""
2009: "" (featuring Pino Daniele)
2011: ""
2011: ""
2011: ""
2011: ""
2011: "I love my bike"
2012: ""
2012: ""
2012: "" (featuring Steve Forest)
2012: "" (featuring Emis Killa, Club Dogo & Marracash)
2014: "" (featuring Nina Zilli)
2015: ""
2015: "Maria Salvador" (featuring Il Cile)
2015: "Miss & Mr Hide"
2015: "" (featuring Elio)
2015: "Intro" (featuring Bianca Atzei)
2016: "" with Fedez
2016: ""  with Fedez featuring Stash and Levante   
2017: ""  with Fedez featuring Alessandra Amoroso 
2017: ""  with Fedez featuring T-Pain 
2018: ""  with Fedez 
2018: ""
2019: ""
2019: ""
2020: ""  (featuring Max Pezzali)

Awards 
1995: Un disco per l'estate
2007: MTV Europe Music Awards: Best Italian Act
2010: TRL Awards 2010: TRL History
2012: MTV Hip Hop Awards: Best Live
2012: MTV Hip Hop Awards: Best Collaboration

Books
 , 1998, Ricordi-Publication.
 , 2012, Tv Sorrisi e Canzoni.
 , 2014, Feltrinelli.
 , 2016, Mondadori.

Filmography

Films

Television

References

External links 
 Official site
 Official MySpace
 Spaghetti Funk Site
 Official articolo 31 site

20th-century Italian male  singers
21st-century Italian  male singers
Italian pop singers
1989 births
Italian rappers
Living people
Singers from Milan